Pleurona is a genus of moths of the family Erebidae. The genus was erected by Francis Walker in 1866.

Species
Pleurona ochrolutea Hulstaert, 1924
Pleurona rudis Walker
Pleurona sirenia Viette, 1956
Pleurona falcata Walker, 1866

References

Calpinae
Noctuoidea genera